Roy Hilton Barbour (born 2 June 1935) is a Rhodesian former field hockey player. He competed in the men's tournament at the 1964 Summer Olympics.

References

External links
 

1935 births
Living people
Rhodesian male field hockey players
Olympic field hockey players of Rhodesia
Field hockey players at the 1964 Summer Olympics
Sportspeople from Bulawayo